The 1975 VFL Grand Final was an Australian rules football game contested between the North Melbourne Football Club and the Hawthorn Football Club, held at the Melbourne Cricket Ground in Melbourne on 27 September 1975. It was the 78th annual Grand Final of the Victorian Football League, staged to determine the premiers for the 1975 VFL season. The match, attended 110,551 spectators, was won by North Melbourne by a margin of 55 points, marking that club's first premiership victory. In doing so, it became the last of the 12 VFL teams to win a flag. The last time North had won a flag prior to that was back in 1918 when they were part of the Victorian Football Association.

Background

North Melbourne had finished runners up the previous season, having been defeated by Richmond in the 1974 VFL Grand Final, and were the only team not to have won a premiership. This was Hawthorn's first appearance in a Grand Final in four years, having defeated St Kilda in the 1971 VFL Grand Final.

North Melbourne lost six of the first nine games of the season before finally hitting their stride, winning eleven of the next thirteen games. At the conclusion of the regular home-and-away season, Hawthorn finished first on the ladder with 17 wins and 5 losses, and North Melbourne had finished third (behind Carlton) with 14 wins and 8 losses.

In the finals series leading up to the Grand Final, North Melbourne defeated Carlton by 20 points in the Qualifying Final before being beaten by Hawthorn by 11 points in the Second Semi-Final. They then met Richmond in the Preliminary Final which they won by 17 points to advance to the Grand Final. Hawthorn advanced straight to the Grand Final on the back of their win in the Second Semi-Final.

Hawthorn captain Peter Crimmins was overlooked for the 1975 Grand Final after being struck down by testicular cancer. Crimmins declared that he was fit to play after playing 5 reserve games, including one final, and both the selection committee and Hawthorn's supporters were divided over whether he should play. Ultimately the match committee decided against playing him in the game, with coach John Kennedy admitting they were fearful a knock could affect him. As he explained later: "It was very hard, it was a unique situation ... Peter wanted to play. The committee was divided. He didn't play. We'll never know what might have happened if he had played."

Teams

Umpires 
The umpiring panel for the match, comprising one field umpire, two boundary umpires and two goal umpires is given below. This was the last Grand final with one field umpire officiating. 

Numbers in brackets represent the number of grand finals umpired, including 1975.

Match summary
North Melbourne were on top from the beginning of the game, accumulating nine goals by half time to Hawthorn's five.  After the half, North blew the game open, with its last six goals of the match extending the margin from 24 points to 61. Their final winning margin of 55 points was the biggest in a Premiership decider since the 1957 VFL Grand Final.

Contributing strongly for North Melbourne were Brent Crosswell, John Rantall, Keith Greig, John Burns, David Dench, Mick Nolan, Sam Kekovich and Doug Wade. Arnold Briedis kicked five goals for the Kangaroos. Peter Knights stood out for Hawthorn.

The selection of full-forward Michael Cooke proved to be disastrous for Hawthorn. His four goals in the Semi Final (his league debut) helped the Hawks book a spot in the premiership decider, for which he kept his spot in the side. However, Cooke struggled in the Grand Final and was replaced without managing a kick. He never played another senior game.

It was in this game that Kennedy made his famous "Don't think, do" speech. As he recalled, "It was born out of desperation. We had some academics in the team who did a lot of thinking, so I, more or less in exasperation, said 'Don't think, do!"

Epilogue
For North Melbourne it would be the final league game for captain Barry Davis, full-forward Wade and the versatile Gary Farrant. It was also the last time Rantall played with North as he returned to South Melbourne the following season.

This was the first of two consecutive Grand Finals to be contested between these teams.  In the 1976 VFL Grand Final the fortunes were reversed, with Hawthorn running out winners by a margin of 30 points.

This was the last Grand Final to be played under one umpire. The 1976 Grand Final saw the introduction of two field umpires.

Scorecard

References

Bibliography
 
 Hutchinson, G. & Ross, J. (eds), The Clubs: The Complete History of Every Club in the VFL/AFL, Viking, (Ringwood), 1998. 
 Ross, J. (ed), 100 Years of Australian Football 1897-1996: The Complete Story of the AFL, All the Big Stories, All the Great Pictures, All the Champions, Every AFL Season Reported, Viking, (Ringwood), 1996.

External links

 
Games you may have missed: State Library of Victoria Australian Rules research guide

See also
 1975 VFL season

VFL/AFL Grand Finals
Grand
North Melbourne Football Club
Hawthorn Football Club